On August 6, 1969, a destructive tornado outbreak affected portions of north central Minnesota on August 6, 1969. The severe weather event generated 13 confirmed tornadoes, killed 15 people, and caused 109 injuries. To date, the outbreak remains the deadliest on record in the North Woods region of Minnesota. It is also known as the 1969 Minnesota tornado outbreak and the 1969 North Woods tornado outbreak. The most destructive tornado of the outbreak was a  violent F4 that leveled miles of timberland and farmland across portions of Crow Wing, Cass, and Aitkin counties in Minnesota, killing at least 12 people and injuring 70 others.

Background

Very warm, humid, summertime air had pushed into central and southern Minnesota on August 6, 1969. Meanwhile, strong upper-level winds over northern Minnesota and an approaching cold front from the west added the needed ingredient for the strong storms. These parallel storms generated 13 tornadoes, killing fifteen people and injuring 109.

The first tornado of the day, rated F0, touched down at 1:15 p.m. CDT (12:15 p.m. CST; 18:15 UTC) in Beltrami County. The main tornado event started about three hours later in Cass County when an F3 tornado touched down southwest of Backus, injuring four people. The most damaging tornado of the outbreak touched down at 4:48 p.m. CDT (3:48 p.m. CST; 21:48 UTC) in Crow Wing County. It achieved F4 strength, traveling  through Crow Wing, Cass and Aitkin counties.  The area around Outing was especially hard hit by this tornado, where eleven deaths and forty injuries occurred on the shores of Roosevelt Lake.

Several more strong tornadoes touched down over the next two hours, killing one person near Jacobson and two people near Two Harbors.  Damage and casualties were limited, however, because most of the twisters struck rural areas.

Confirmed tornadoes

At least one additional tornado occurred near Bear Island Lake in St. Louis County, Minnesota, at around 6:30 p.m. CDT (5:30 p.m. CST; 23:30 UTC), and produced losses of about $10,000, but was not officially listed.

See also
 Climate of Minnesota
 List of North American tornadoes and tornado outbreaks
 Tornadoes of 1969

Notes

References

External links
 Minnesota Tornado History and Statistics
 Gendisasters.com

F4 tornadoes by date
Minnesota,1969-08-06
Tornadoes of 1969
Tornadoes in Minnesota
Tornadoes in Nebraska
1969 in Minnesota
August 1969 events in the United States